The western ground parrot (Pezoporus flaviventris; Noongar name kyloring) is an endangered species of parrot endemic to Western Australia and is a close relative of the eastern ground parrot (Pezoporus wallicus) and the somewhat more distantly related and mysterious night parrot (Pezoporus occidentalis). It is one of the world's rarest birds with about 150 individuals remaining .

The western ground parrot plumage is similar to the eastern ground parrot, but feathers of the abdomen and under tail-coverts are bright yellow with indistinct black barring.

Molecular DNA evidence suggests the western ground parrot split from ground parrots of eastern Australia around 2 million years ago.

Taxonomy
Described as a separate species by Alfred John North in 1911, on account of its distinctive plumage. North compared Western Australian specimens, at the Australian Museum, collected by George Masters in the 1860s at a location noted as King George Sound. The specific name, flaviventris, is derived from the Latin terms flavus "golden-yellow" and venter "belly". The western ground parrot was subsequently considered a subspecies of the eastern ground parrot by Gregory Mathews in 1912. He felt it not distinctive enough to warrant specific rank. Other authorities followed suit, until a 2010 molecular study revealed its genetic distinctness from populations in eastern Australia and Tasmania. The third species in genus is the endangered and mysterious night parrot (Pezoporus occidentalis). The phylogenetic position of the genus Pezoporus within the parrot family remains unclear.

Description

The western ground parrot plumage is similar to the eastern ground parrot (P. wallicus), but feathers of the abdomen and under tail-coverts are bright yellow with indistinct black barring. The fledgling western ground parrot is a more neutral grey/brown in colour, while the eastern ground parrot has bright green (adult) plumage in these areas.  The fledgling western ground parrot is grey/brown around the head, wing covets and across the back, while the eastern ground parrot has bright green (adult) plumage in these areas.  This plumage difference would provide better camouflage to mobile fledglings in the habitat typical of the southwest arid regions where they reside.  In contrast the eastern ground parrot lives in thick vegetation with little open ground.

Distribution and habitat
Historically, this species was found all along the coast of western southwest Australia from Perth north to Geraldton and along the South Coast east to Israelite Bay. However, it appears to have vanished from the west coast of Western Australia by 1900. Nowadays, the range of this species is limited to two locations along the south coast of Western Australia, east of Albany with the largest population in Cape Arid National Park.

Low heathland usually on deep white sand with a large diversity of plants is the most common habitat. Parrots appear to be more abundant in heath which has not been burnt for decades, but have been found in areas six years after a burn. There is usually a fairly high component of sedges.

Conservation

Status
This species is one of the rarest bird species in the world. The first photo of the western ground parrot in the wild was taken in 2004. This species declined rapidly between 1990 and 2009, from about 400 individuals to 110 individuals. Most individuals (~100 as of 2008) are found in the Cape Arid National Park. A 2018 study ranked it fourth in a list of Australian birds most likely to go extinct.

The main threats are introduced predators, such as foxes and feral cats, as well as bushfires.

Much of the local vegetation is vulnerable to Phytophthora cinnamomi dieback and it is unclear what impact the loss of certain food items may have on the species, but as of 1997 there were believed to be fewer than 40 parrots left.
In November 2015, intense bushfires around Esperance burnt almost all of the western ground parrot's habitat. The impact on the population is unclear.

 the species has not yet been evaluated by the IUCN, but it meets several criteria to be considered critically endangered. It is listed as "critically endangered" by the Australian Government under the EPBC Act, and by he Western Australian Government under the Biodiversity Conservation Act 2016 (WA).

Measures
Seven critically endangered western ground parrots were transferred by the Department of Parks and Wildlife of Western Australia in July 2014 from a secluded south coast enclosure in Western Australia to the Perth Zoo, where it was hoped they would breed.

Behaviour

The western ground parrot usually feeds alone or with one other bird. They are rarely seen because they rarely fly or call during daylight, and they are usually hidden among low vegetation. Their plumage offers a good camouflage.  If flushed it will fly low over the vegetation, then land again up to 100 or so metres away.  Flight when flushed is characterised by a zigzag pattern with short gliding phases and rapid wingbeats. Calling periods are at dusk and early morning before the sun rises; it is a variable high-pitched call audible for some distance and answered by neighbouring members of the species.

Diet
Seeds of various plants especially sedges. e.g. Mesomaelaena stygia ssp. stygia. Flower buds and the base of flowers e.g. beaufortias, dryandras and grevilleas are also important parts of the diet. A western ground parrot has been observed feeding on the semi-succulent leaves of Daviesia pachyphylla. The diet is varied and utilises the high diversity of their habitat.

Breeding

In November 2018 a western ground parrot nest (not in use) was found in Cape Arid National Park during field work carried out by the Department of Parks and Wildlife. This was the first new discovery of a nest since the discovery made in 1913 by F. Lawson Whitlock, who described the nest as a slight depression among low prickly vegetation (possibly the genus Hakea) on a low ridge. Fledglings have been recorded from September to November.  Males feed females on the ground in "mate-feeding arenas", arriving silently just after dusk.  Females elicit food from the male by issuing a short rasping begging call (termed scree).  On hot dry days the male has difficulty in moving his crop contents as he does not go to water sources during the day.  Instead he derives his liquid from the plant material ingested.  Hence when the day is hot and dry the crop contents becomes thick and difficult to regurgitate.  In the later periods of nesting the female becomes very insistent and will even chase the male when he stops feeding her.  Typically at the end of feeding his mate the male gives a loud call and moves a short distance away, while the female leaves undetected from the area.  The male may then roost near this site.  The nest can be as much as 400 m (1300 ft) from this area, as indicated by the presence of a nearly fledge chick of a known pair monitored in 2005.  The female can lay up to five eggs in a recess within a clump of low vegetation which she lines with vegetation. A vacant nest may have been found in 1989 by Ray Garstone while working in Fitzgerald River National Park.  While the long unburnt habitat is necessary for nesting it is often adjacent to younger more recently burnt habitat which can provide a richer and more varied food source.  Being among the few ground nesting parrots the young ground parrots leave the nest before fledge and are only capable of short unsteady flight.  These young have only been seen on two occasions in the last 90 years.  Post fledging the young are assumed to be attended by the male (field indications support this).

References

External links
Friends of the Western Ground Parrot
Western ground parrot - emergency intervention: Year 3 Scorecard (2018) (Department of Climate Change, Energy, the Environment and Water, Australian Government)

western ground parrot
Endemic birds of Southwest Australia
western ground parrot
western ground parrot